The Scranton Iron Furnaces is a historic site that  preserves the heritage of iron making in the U.S. State of Pennsylvania and is located in Scranton, near the Steamtown National Historic Site. It protects the remains of four stone blast furnaces which were built between 1848 and 1857. Iron production on the site was started by Scranton, Grant & Company in 1840. Later, the furnaces were operated by the Lackawanna Iron & Coal Company. In 1847, iron rails for the Erie Railroad were made at the site. In 1865, Scranton, Grant & Company had the largest iron production capacity in the United States. In 1875, steel production started at the site. In 1880, the furnaces produced 125,000 tons of pig iron, one of the main uses of which was in the making of t-rails. The plant was closed in 1902, when production was shifted to Lackawanna, New York.

The site has been managed by the Pennsylvania Historical and Museum Commission since 1971 and is part of the Pennsylvania Anthracite Heritage Museum complex. It was added to the National Register of Historic Places in 1991, as the Lackawanna Iron and Coal Company Furnace.

During the 2000 U.S. presidential election campaign, former U.S. Vice President Al Gore held a campaign rally at the site.

References

 Official Scranton Iron Furnaces website
 Online article with many images
 

Industrial buildings and structures on the National Register of Historic Places in Pennsylvania
Industrial buildings completed in 1848
Industrial buildings completed in 1857
Museums in Scranton, Pennsylvania
Industry museums in Pennsylvania
National Register of Historic Places in Lackawanna County, Pennsylvania
1857 establishments in Pennsylvania